Gail Miller may refer to:

Gail Miller (murder victim) (1948–1969), Canadian nursing student
Gail Miller (water polo) (born 1976), Australian water polo player
Gail Miller (businesswoman), American businesswoman and philanthropist, widow of Larry H. Miller